Coralliophila mandji is a species of sea snail, a marine gastropod mollusk, in the family Muricidae, the murex snails or rock snails.

Distribution
This species occurs in the Atlantic Ocean off Gabon.

References

External links
 MNHN, Paris: holotype

Endemic fauna of Gabon
mandji
Gastropods described in 1989